Petrus van den Eynde (23 October 1787 – 5 April 1840) was a Dutch lithographer.

Van den Eynde was a captain in the infantry by profession, and an amateur lithographer, draftsman, and painter. Born in 1787 in Haarlem, he was active in Ghent and Haarlem from 1802 until 1840, the year of his death.

Gallery

Sources
 Kramm, Christiaan, De levens en werken der Hollandsche en Vlaamsche kunstschilders, beeldhouwers, graveurs en bouwmeesters, van den vroegsten tot op onzen tijd... (Strekkende tevens tot vervolg op het werk van J. Immerzeel, Jr.), vol. 2 (1858), p. 470
 Thieme, Ulrich; Becker, Felix, Allgemeines Lexikon der bildenden Künstler: von der Antike bis zur Gegenwart, 1907-1950, vol. 11 (1915), p. 140
 Waller, F. G.; Juynboll, Willem R., Biographisch woordenboek van Noord Nederlandsche graveurs, 1938/1974, p. 97 (as Pieter van den Eynde)
 Scheen, Pieter A., Lexicon Nederlandse beeldende kunstenaars, 's-Gravenhage, 1969
 Scheen, Pieter A., Lexicon Nederlandse beeldende kunstenaars, 1750-1880, 1981, p. 144 (as: Eynde, Pieter (Petrus) van den)
 Jacobs, P.M.J.E., Beeldend Benelux: biografisch handboek, Tilburg: Stichting Studiecentrum voor beeldende kunst, 2000
 Beyer, Andreas; Savoy, Bénédicte; Tegethoff, Wolf; König, Eberhard, Allgemeines Künstlerlexikon: die bildenden Künstler aller Zeiten und Völker, vol. 35 (2003), p. 543

References

External links

1787 births
1840 deaths
People from Haarlem
Dutch lithographers